Tormod C. Endresen (born December 10, 1966) is a Norwegian lawyer and diplomat. From 2012 till 2017, he served as Norway's ambassador to Singapore.

Education and Career 
Tormod C. Endresen holds a Law Degree (Candidate of Law) from University of Oslo. From 2008 to 2012, Endresen established and led Norway's Consulate General in Guangzhou, China. In 2012, he was appointed as Norway's ambassador to Singapore. Previously, Endresen served as Second Secretary to Norway's Mission to the United Nations in New York and as Deputy Director General at the Norwegian Ministry of Foreign Affairs. Endresen practiced law at Oslo law firm Wiersholm from 2001 to 2003. He has served as Governor of the Board of the Asia Europe Foundation and as Alternate Board Member of the Extractive Industries Transparency Initiative (EITI).

Ambassador to Singapore
Endresen was confirmed as Norway's Ambassador to Singapore in 2012 and presented his credentials to Singapore's president Tony Tan on September 20 that year. He was succeeded by Anita Nergaard in 2017.

Distinctions and awards
In 2013, Endresen was awarded Commander of the Royal Norwegian Order of Merit by His Majesty Harald V of Norway. In 2015, the Confederation of Norwegian Enterprise (NHO) named Endresen “Ambassador of the year” for his work to promote Norwegian interests.

Personal life
Endresen has four children and is married to Elisabeth Lothe, a Norwegian career diplomat.

References

External links
Royal Norwegian Embassy in Singapore
Tormod Cappelen Endresen in "Store Norske Leksikon"

University of Oslo alumni
Living people
Ambassadors of Norway to Singapore
1966 births